In Libya there are currently 106 districts, second level administrative subdivisions known in Arabic as baladiyat (singular baladiyah).  The number has varied since 2013 between 99 and 108.  The first level administrative divisions in Libya are currently the governorates (muhafazat), which have yet to be formally deliniated, but which were originally tripartite as: Tripolitania in the northwest, Cyrenaica in the east, and Fezzan in the southwest; and later divided into ten governorates.

Prior to 2013 there were twenty-two first level administrative subdivisions known by the term shabiyah (Arabic singular  šaʿbiyya, plural šaʿbiyyāt) which constituted the districts of Libya. In the 1990s the shabiyat had replaced an older baladiyat system.

Historically the area of Libya was considered three provinces (or states), Tripolitania in the northwest, Cyrenaica in the east, and Fezzan in the southwest.  It was the conquest by Italy in the Italo-Turkish War that united them in a single political unit. Under the Italians Libya was eventually divided into four provinces and one territory: Tripoli, Misrata, Benghazi, Derna, (in the north) and the Territory of the Libyan Sahara (in the south). After the French and British occupied Libya in 1943, it was again split into three provinces: Tripolitania in the northwest, Cyrenaica in the east, and Fezzan-Ghadames in the southwest.

Article 176 of the 1951 constitution of Libya stated "The Kingdom of Libya shall be divided into administrative units in conformity with the law to be promulgated in this connection. Local and regional councils may be formed in the Kingdom. The extent of these units shall be determined by law which shall likewise organize these Councils." in exact quote.

After independence (1951), Libya was divided into three governorates (muhafazat), matching the three provinces of before, but in 1963 it was divided into ten governorates. In 1983 a new system was introduced dividing the country into forty-six districts (baladiyat). In 1987 this was reduced to twenty-five districts.

On 2 August 1995, Libya reorganized into thirteen districts (shabiyat). In 1998 this was increased to 26 shabiyat districts. In 2001 it was increased to thirty-two districts plus three administrative regions.  Finally in 2007 it was reduced to twenty-two districts.

For historical evolution see also: Subdivisions of Libya.

Libyan districts are further subdivided into Basic People's Congresses which act as townships or boroughs.

Etymology
The term  in Arabic can mean both "popularity" or "That that is of the people" or more simply "pertaining to the people".  The second meaning was used by the Libyan government to refer to the districts of Libya, in tandem with the general ideology of the state.  Sha'biyat in Libya are the highest administrative level.  A lower level, equivalent to a county, exists and divides each Shabiyah into smaller entities.

The term was new and exclusive to Libya, in line with exclusive terms for republic (jamahiriya), ministry (amanah) and embassy (people's-bureau)—all of which are different from what is used throughout Arabic-speaking countries, including even Libya itself before its adoption of the neology.

Districts (Shabiya)
Shabiyah (  šaʿbiyyah, plural:   šaʿbiyyāt)  is a neologism exclusive to Libya under Gaddafi,  in line with exclusive terms for republic (jamahiriya), ministry (amanah) and embassy (people's-bureau).
The term basically means a district, that is, a top level administrative division. Etymologically, it is an adjective meaning "of or pertaining to the people, popular".

22 districts (2007) 
In 2007 the twenty-two districts (shabiya) replaced the older thirty-two district system.

The list is as following:

32 districts (2001)
The 2001 reorganization of Libya into districts (shabiya) resulted in thirty-two districts and three administrative regions (المنطقة الإدارية): 

The three administrative regions are missing from the above map, Qatrun, Marada, and Jaghbub

26 districts (1998)
In 1998 Libya was reorganized into twenty-six districts which were: Butnan, Jafara, Jufra, Kufra, Marj, Murqub, Quba, Al Wahat, Bani Walid, Benghazi, Derna, Gharyan, Jabal al Akhdar, Murzuq, Misrata, Nalut, Nuqat al Khams, Sabha, Sabrata/Sorman, Sirte, Tarhuna/Msalata, Tripoli, Wadi al Hayaa, Wadi al Shatii, Yafran, and Zawiya

13 districts (1995)
On 2 August 1995 Libya dropped the baladiyat system and reorganized into thirteen districts (shabiyat).  Among them were Butnan (formerly Tobruk), Jabal al Akhdar, Jabal al Gharbi, Zawiya, Benghazi, and Tripoli.  However, there is not agreement about the other seven names.

Former baladiya  
Baladiyah (singular) or baladiyat (plural), are Arabic words used in many Arab countries to denote administrative divisions of the country. In Libya, the baladiyat system of districts was introduced in 1983 to replace the governorate system.  Originally there were forty-six baladiyat districts, but in 1988 that number was reduced to twenty-five baladiyat. The table hereunder lists the old twenty-five baladiyat in alphabetical order with a link to each one and numbered to be located on the map. Note that each district linked may be both a baladiyah and a shabiyah. The many changes may not always be reflected in the article. 
 

  1 Ajdabiya
  2 ‘Aziziya
  3 Butnan
  4 Fati
  5 Jabal al Akhdar
  6 Jufra
  7 Khoms
  8 Kufra
  9 Nuqat al Khams
 10 Wadi al Shatii
 11 Ubari
 12 Zawiya
 13 Benghazi

 14 Derna
 15 Ghadames
 16 Gharyan
 17 Misrata
 18 Murzuq
 19 Sabha
 20 Sawfajjin
 21 Sirte
 22 Tripoli
 23 Tarhuna
 24 Yafran
 25 Zlitan

Evolution 

For 1995 data, [4] and [5] are the two different sources mentioned in the bibliography: "The Europa World Year Book 2001" and "Ershiyi (21) Shiji Shijie Diming Lu", Beijing, 2001.

For 1988, name is provided if different from nowadays. As said above, AR stands for the three "Administrative Region" of 2001.

Fazzan wasn't strictly a district, but a historical muhafazah or wilayah along with Tripolitania (capital Tripoli) and Cyrenaica (capital Cyrene -near nowadays Shahhat- with Diocletian, moved to Ptolemais after the earthquake of 365, and to Barce -nowadays Barca- with Omer Bin Khattab in 643).

See also 
 FIPS region codes of Libya
 ISO 3166-2:LY
 List of cities in Libya
 Subdivisions of Libya

Notes

External links

Historical population data by district from Universiteitsbibliotheek Utrecht (Library, University of Utrecht), retrieved by WebArchive.
Administrative Map of Libya – Nations Online Project

 
Libya
Districts, Libya
Libya geography-related lists
Libya, Districts